The cap Trinité is a rock wall in three plateaus of the Baie Éternité overhanging the Saguenay River, the Le Fjord-du-Saguenay Regional County Municipality, in Saguenay-Lac-Saint-Jean, in Quebec, Canada. This natural elevation is located in Saguenay Fjord National Park.

There is the Statue of Notre-Dame-du-Saguenay.

Toponymy 

The Commission de toponymie du Québec writes about it: "The origin of the name would be linked to its particular form as described thus :" Cape Trinité was given its name because it is actually formed by three equal caps of size and elevation, the first of which also includes three caps arranged in echelon and forming like three superimposed stages".

Geography

History

Tourism 
Cape Trinité is the main attraction of Saguenay Fjord National Park.

In culture

Legend 
According to a legend montagnais, the cape Trinité would be the result of the combat between Mayo, the first Montagnais, and of a bad manitou. While he was paddling on the Saguenay, a creature appeared from the river to attack it. Mayo, responding only with his courage, took the creature by the tail and smashed it on the mountain. It was at the third stroke that the beast was crushed, which explains the three levels of the cape. Where the manitou hit the rock, no more vegetation grew.

Poetry 
Louis-Honoré Fréchette wrote, in 1873, a poem titled Le cap Trinité.

Charles Gill was also inspired by the Saguenay capes. The song VIIIe of the collection "Le Cap Éternité followed des Étoiles filantes", entitled "Le Cap Trinité", begins as follows:

Photo gallery

Notes and references

See also 

 Saguenay Fjord National Park

Landforms of Saguenay–Lac-Saint-Jean
Le Fjord-du-Saguenay Regional County Municipality